Shimon Lankri is the current mayor of Acre, Israel (Akko). He was first elected in 2003, and reelected in 2008, 2013 and 2018.

In 2013, Lankri was shot by masked gunmen while he was driving near his home. In 2015, Lankri visited Azerbaijan with the head of Acre's Azerbaijani Mountain Jews community. 

In 2016, he was part of the inauguration of a ferry service between Haifa and Acre. The trip takes 45 minutes.

In 2017, Lankri and national government leaders announced plans to expand housing for a projected doubling of the city's size.

Lankri was part of the opening of an American Corners in Acre. Lankri is a member of Pnima, a group working to alleviate divisions among Jews in Israel. Lankri supports youth centers that double as pool halls.

Arab-Jewish relations

Arab residents have expressed concerns about getting their fair share of services and schools, and have become increasingly concerned over very religious and nationalist settler Jews having moved to the city, but Lankri has said all residents are treated equally and supported development projects. About 28 percent of the city is Arab and lives in a more run down section of the city.

Lankri has been chairman of the Acre Festival. In 2008 he cancelled the festival after clashes between Muslim and Jewish residents.

In 2017, Lankri weighed in on a proposed ban of a Palestinian performance of a play about Palestinian prisoners in Israel from the Fringe Theater Festival of Acre.

References

Mayors of places in Israel
Living people
Shooting survivors
Year of birth missing (living people)
People from Acre, Israel